Wan Peng (born 20 August 1996) is a Chinese actress under Easy Entertainment.She is also a Classical Dancer.She made her debut with the drama When We Were Young (2018), and gained significant fame for her performances in My Girlfriend is an Alien (2019), First Romance (2020), Crush (2021) and My Girlfriend is an Alien 2 (2022).

Career
In 2018, Wan made her debut in the coming-of-age youth drama When We Were Young opposite Hou Minghao, for which she received positive reviews and became known for her role. She received the Best Newcomer award at the China News Entertainment Awards and the Outstanding Actress award at the China Internet Radio and Video Convention.

In 2019, Wan then played supporting roles in the period detective drama Detective L and medical rescue drama Rush Into Danger. Her popularity increased after starring in the hit romantic comedy My Girlfriend is an Alien opposite Thassapak Hsu, and she was awarded Most Promising Television Actor at the Tencent Video All Star Awards.

In 2020, Wan continued to play leading roles in the campus youth romance dramas First Romance opposite Riley Wang, and Meeting You opposite Guo Yunchen.

In 2021, she starred as the female lead in the historical drama Love Like White Jade opposite Zhang Yao, and romance drama Crush opposite Lin Yan Jun, after broadcasting this Drama received positive response from netizens and became one of the successful Drama of her, she also sung the title song of this Drama "Meeting You" along with Lin Yan Jun, and This Year she Also starred in Unit Drama Faith Makes Great : Stargazing.

In 2022 , she starred as the female lead in the Urban Drama A Year Without A Job and well received Fantasy Drama My Girlfriend is an Alien 2 opposite Thassapak Hsu, also in the same year she starred in Unit Drama Our Times: Night Banquet of Tang Palace.

Wan Upcoming Project is Crime Based Drama The Lost Eleventh Floor, and Costume (Historical) Drama Sword and Fairy (Chinese Paladin 6) based on Sixth season of the game The Legend of Sword and Fairy, 

Wan currently filming a family healing Drama There is a Lover in My Hometown in Quanzhou Fuijan China.￼

Discography

Soundtrack Appearance

Filmography

Television series

Awards and nominations

References

External links
Wan Peng Official ID on Instagram  
Wan Peng Profile on Douban (in Chinese)
Wan Peng Profile on Viki
Wan Peng Profile on Imdb
Wan Peng Profile on IQIYI

 

1996 births 
Living people 
Beijing Dance Academy alumni 
21st-century Chinese actresses 
Chinese television actresses